Waterston is a village near Milford Haven in Pembrokeshire, Wales, in the community and parish of Llanstadwell. The built-up area had a population of 335 in 2011.

Part of the village lies within the boundaries of the Dragon LNG terminal. The plant is expected to process between 10 and 20 percent of the UK's gas supply requirement.

References

Villages in Pembrokeshire
Milford Haven